The International Shoe Company Building is a historic shoe factory building located at 160 N. Main St. in St. Clair, Franklin County, Missouri. The building was erected in 1922 as a factory for the International Shoe Company.  It is a three-story, irregular shaped building with a flat asphalt roof.  It has a four-story elevator tower.  The factory closed in 1982.

It has been listed on the National Register of Historic Places since April 7, 1994.

References

Shoe factories
Industrial buildings and structures on the National Register of Historic Places in Missouri
Industrial buildings completed in 1922
Buildings and structures in Franklin County, Missouri
National Register of Historic Places in Franklin County, Missouri